Manduca scutata is a moth of the  family Sphingidae.

Distribution 
It is found from Venezuela south to Bolivia and northern Argentina.

Description 
The wingspan is about 95 mm.

Biology 
 Adults have been recorded in November.

References

Manduca
Moths described in 1903
Sphingidae of South America
Moths of South America